Pangea is a submarine telecommunications cable system transiting the North Sea connecting UK with Denmark and Netherlands. By 2002 it was no longer in service. It consisted of two widely separated submarine segments - Pangea North and Pangea South.

Pangea North segment of length 685 km had landing points at:
 Redcar, England, UK
 Fanø, Denmark

From Fanø, an island off the coast of Jutland, there were an onwards section to the mainland, landing near Esbjerg at

 Måde, Denmark

Pangea South segment of length 252 km had landing points at:
 Lowestoft, England, UK
 Beverwijk, Netherlands

The cable systems were deployed as a part of a larger effort by the network operator, Pangea Europe Limited, to connect countries in the Nordic region. However, the company already had economic difficulties in September 2001 and bankruptcy was filed in 2002 shortly after Pangea was finished. The cable ownership were transferred first to Arrowhead and Nortel and then to become a part of Linx Telecom (now CITIC Telecom CPC) later in 2004.

Maps

References

Submarine communications cables in the North Sea
Denmark–United Kingdom relations
Netherlands–United Kingdom relations
Denmark–Netherlands relations